Japetus is a genus of planthoppers in the family Fulgoridae, subfamily Poiocerinae. Species are distributed from Venezuela to Brazil.

Species
 Japetus lichenus Bleuzen & Porion, 2004
 Japetus tostus (Stål, 1859)

References

Auchenorrhyncha genera
Poiocerinae